Nyarugenge is a district (akarere) in Kigali Province, Rwanda. Its heart is the city centre of Kigali (which is towards the west of the urban area and the province), and contains most of the city's businesses.

Sectors 
Nyarugenge district is divided into 10 sectors (imirenge): Gitega, Kanyinya, Kigali, Kimisagara, Mageragere, Muhima, Nyakabanda, Nyamirambo, Nyarugenge and Rwezamenyo.

Populatión 

{| class=wikitable style="margin: 1em 1em 0 0; border-collapse: collapse; font-size: 100%;" align="center"
|-bgcolor="#35682D" style="color:black"
! colspan="3" style="text-align:center; color:white; background:#2E8B57;"| Sectors of the Nyarugenge District by population according to the 2022 census 
|-
! N°
! Sectors of District  Nyarugenge 
! 
|- align="center" style="background:#efefef; color:black 
! 1°| align="left"|
| align="right"|61,499
|- align="center" 
! 2°| align="left"|
| align="right"|59,747
|- align="center" style="background:#efefef; color:black 
! 3°| align="left"|
| align="right"|56,534
|- align="center"
! 4°| align="left"|
| align="right"|55,315
|- align="center" style="background:#efefef; color:black 
! 5°| align="left"|
| align="right"|31,026
|- align="center"
! 6°| align="left"|
| align="right"|29,580
|- align="center" style="background:#efefef; color:black 
! 7°| align="left"|
| align="right"|26,668
|- align="center"
! 8°| align="left"|
| align="right"|22,531
|- align="center" style="background:#efefef; color:black 
! 9°| align="left"|
| align="right"|16,665
|- align="center"
! 10°| align="left"|
| align="right"|14,754
|- align="center" bgcolor=#D0E7FF
! Total| align="left"|Nyarugenge District 
| align="right"|374,319'|}

EducationLycée de Kigali (LDK) is in Kiyovu Cell, Nyarugenge Sector, Nyarugenge District.

 References 

External links

 
 Inzego.doc — Province, District and Sector information from MINALOC'', the Rwanda ministry of local government.

Kigali Province
Districts of Rwanda